Portland Police may refer to:

 Port of Portland Police Department (Oregon), USA
 Port of Portland Police (United Kingdom)
 Portland Police Bureau, Oregon, USA
 Portland Police Department (Maine), USA
 Portland Police Department (Texas), USA
 South Portland Police Department (Maine), USA